Piracy Act is a stock short title used for legislation in the United Kingdom relating to piracy.

The Bill for an Act with this short title may have been known as a Piracy Bill during its passage through Parliament.

List
 The Piracy Act 1670 (22 & 23 Car 2 c 11)
 The Piracy Act 1698
 The Piracy Act 1717
 The Piracy Act 1721
 The Piracy Act 1744 (18 Geo 2 c 30)
 The Piracy Act 1837
 The Piracy Act 1850 (13 & 14 Vict c 26)

See also
Acts of grace (piracy)
List of short titles
Offences at Sea Act 1536

Lists of legislation by short title
Piracy law